Ceferí Olivé i Cabré (born in Reus in 1907, died in the same town in 1995) was a Catalan painter.

Biography
Ceferí Olivé studied with master painter . He specialized in watercolor. He used to sign his paintings with his name in Castilian Spanish: Ceferino Olivé. Many of his paintings are Mediterranean landscapes.

He lived most of his life in Reus, but also spent some time in Barcelona, where he painted railway scenes and shipyards. He also travelled to some European countries.

Most of his exhibitions were in Barcelona and Madrid.

Awards and posthumous honors
Ceferí Olivé is regarded as one of the best watercolor painters in Spain. He won also the first medal of the International Art Gallery in London and an award of the Railway painting Exhibition in Spain. Among the other awards he won, the following deserve mention:
 Galeria Pictoria award, Barcelona, 1941,
 National Watercolor Prize, 1942
 Fortuny Medal in 1942 and in 1943
 Medal of honour of the National Watercolor Exhibition, 1947
 Creu de Sant Jordi in 1985.

There is a street in Reus named after him.

External links
 Museum in Reus
 Olivé Cabré, Ceferí (or Ceferino)

Artists from Catalonia
20th-century Spanish painters
20th-century Spanish male artists
Spanish male painters
People from Reus
1995 deaths
Spanish watercolourists
1907 births